Catríona Power is a camogie player and Occupational Therapist who won Junior All-Ireland championship medals with Dublin in 2005 and 2006.  She also captained Naomh Mearnóg from Portmarnock to their first Dublin senior championship title in 2009, the first senior title in any code for the club.  She was Club Player of the Year in 2007.

References

External links
 Official Camogie Website
 Dublin Camogie website
 Naomh Mearnóg GAA website
 Review of 2009 championship in On The Ball Official Camogie Magazine
 Fixtures and results for the 2009 O'Duffy Cup
 All-Ireland Senior Camogie Championship: Roll of Honour
 Video highlights of 2009 championship Part One and part two
 Video of Dublin’s 2009 championship match against Tipperary
 Video of 2009 Dublin senior semi-final Good Counsel 1-07 Ballyboden 0-8
 Video of 2009 Dublin senior semi-final Naomh Mearnog 3-7 St Vincent’s 0-13

Year of birth missing (living people)
Living people
Dublin camogie players